Bootie may refer to:
 Bootie (bicycle), a folding bicycle manufactured in England
 Bootie (club night), dedicated to mashups and bootlegs
Bootie Island, an island off the northern coast of Queensland, Australia
 Bootee, a type of footwear
 The Bitty Booties, the red characters in Wee Sing in Sillyville

See also
 Booty (disambiguation)
 Booty call (disambiguation)